HMS Isis was an  protected cruiser built for the Royal Navy in the mid-1890s.

Technical details
Eclipse-class second-class protected cruisers were preceded by the shorter Astraea-class cruisers. Isis had a displacement of  when at normal load. It was powered by two inverted triple-expansion steam engines which used steam from eight cylindrical boilers.

It carried five 40-calibre  quick-firing (QF) guns in single mounts protected by gun shields. One gun was mounted on the forecastle, two on the quarterdeck and one pair was abreast the bridge. The secondary armament consisted of six 40-calibre  guns; three on each broadside. It was fitted with three 18-inch torpedo tubes, one submerged tube on each broadside and one above water in the stern. Its ammunition supply consisted of 200 six-inch rounds per gun, 250 shells for each 4.7-inch gun, 300 rounds per gun for the s and 500 for each three-pounder. Isis had ten torpedoes, presumably four for each broadside tube and two for the stern tube.

Service history
Isis deployed to the Mediterranean in 1898 for service in the Mediterranean Fleet. She participated between September and December 1898 in the operations at Crete of the International Squadron, a multinational force made up initially of ships of the Austro-Hungarian Navy, French Navy, Imperial German Navy, Italian Royal Navy (Regia Marina), Imperial Russian Navy, and Royal Navy that intervened between February 1897 and December 1898 in the 1897-1898 Greek Christian uprising against the Ottoman Empire′s rule on the island. By the time Isis joined the squadron, Austria-Hungary and the German Empire had withdrawn from the squadron, but the other four countries remained active in it. In the wake of a violent riot by Cretan Turks against British soldiers, sailors, and Christian civilians in Candia on 6 September 1898, Isis anchored in the harbor and men convicted of murdering British subjects during the riot were held aboard her while awaiting trial and execution. They were hanged in Candia during October and November 1898.

Isis was still in service with the Mediterranean Fleet when Captain George Morris Henderson took command in early 1900. Captain Charles Windham was appointed in command on 28 December 1900, as she served on the China Station, and remained with the ship until January 1902. In late October 1901 she left Hong Kong homebound, arriving at Spithead in December. She paid off at Chatham on 18 January 1902 and was placed in the Fleet Reserve as emergency ship. Following a refit with new steam and gunnery trials, Captain Godfrey H. B. Mundy was appointed in command on 19 September 1902, when she was recommissioned as tender to the Britannia. In early October she left Plymouth for Gibraltar with cadets from the Britannia, following which she went to Las Palmas, cruising in the vicinity of the Canary Islands until she returned to Plymouth via Madeira in late November.

In August 1914 with the outbreak of war, Isis was brought out of the reserve and attached to the 11th Cruiser Squadron based on Queenstown (now Cobh), Ireland. She was later transferred to the North American and West Indies Station, and was scrapped in 1920.

Footnotes

References

 Clowes, Sir William Laird. The Royal Navy: A History From the Earliest Times to the Death of Queen Victoria, Volume Seven. London: Chatham Publishing, 1997. .  

 McTiernan, Mick, A Very Bad Place Indeed For a Soldier. The British involvement in the early stages of the European Intervention in Crete. 1897 - 1898, King's College, London, September 2014.

 

Eclipse-class cruisers
Ships built in Govan
1896 ships
Maritime incidents in April 1914